Museums in the Northern Mariana Islands include:

 NMI Museum of History and Culture
American Memorial Park

Buildings and structures in the Northern Mariana Islands
Northern Mariana Islands
Northern Mariana Islands
Museums